Al-Nasr Sports, Cultural and Social Club (Arabic: نادي النصر الرياضي، ثقافي إجتماعي), also spelled as Al Naser, is a Libyan basketball club based in Benghazi. Founded in 1956, the team has won the Libyan championship three times. Its most recent title was in 2018.

Al-Nasr, which was previously funded by the family of Muammar Gaddafi, was featured in the 2013 memoir Qaddafi's Point Guard by Alex Owumi, who played for the team leading up to the Libyan Civil War in 2011.

Honours
Libyan Division I Basketball League: 3
2009, 2017, 2018
Libyan Cup: 3
2009, 2014, 2017

In international competitions

Players

Notable players

 Alex Owumi
 Stanley Gumut
 Ibrahima Thomas
 Mike Taylor
 Donald Cole
 Terrell Stoglin

Head coaches

References

Basketball teams in Libya
Basketball teams established in 1956
Road to BAL teams